Huddersfield Town's 1959–60 campaign was Town's best season following their relegation from Division 1 4 years earlier. The main points of the season were the resignation of Bill Shankly, who would then lead Liverpool to greatness in his years in charge. Their FA Cup win over West Ham United in the third round replay at Upton Park, which would inadvertently lead to the departure of Denis Law to Manchester City for a record-breaking fee of £55,000.

Squad at the start of the season

Review
Bill Shankly made good progress with Town at the start of the season, leading them to 5 wins in their first 7 league games. A dreadful run of only 1 win in 10 games saw Town slide down the table and then on 1 December, Shankly resigned to take charge of league rivals Liverpool.  Shankly's last match in charge of Town was against the Anfield outfit. Ex-Town player Eddie Boot took charge of Town for the rest of the season. He led Town on a charge up the table mainly consisting of alternating wins and losses. However, Town's form led them to a finish of 6th place, their best finish since relegation 4 years earlier.

Another highlight of the season was the astonishing win over West Ham United in the FA Cup third round replay at Upton Park with a score of 5 goals to 1. This win showcased the amazing talents of Denis Law, who within 2 months broke the transfer record for a British player after transferring to Manchester City for £55,000.

Squad at the end of the season

Results

Division Two

FA Cup

Appearances and goals

1959-60
English football clubs 1959–60 season